The Planistromellaceae are a family of fungi with an uncertain taxonomic placement in the class Dothideomycetes.

References

External links 
 Index Fungorum

Dothideales
Dothideomycetes families
Taxa named by Margaret Elizabeth Barr-Bigelow